Serangoon Garden Secondary School (SGS) is a co-educational government secondary school located in Serangoon, Singapore.

History
Serangoon Garden Secondary School was founded in 1959 as Lichfield Secondary School at Lichfield Road in Serangoon.

In 1969, the school absorbed the neighbouring school, Hwi Yoh Vocational School, and in 1970, became Serangoon Garden Secondary School. It became a bilingual secondary school with both English and Chinese streams, with facilities for the teaching of academic, technical and commercial subjects. In 1984, it became a purely English stream school with the last batch of Chinese stream graduating in the same year. The school moved to its current premises in 2004.

Notable alumni
 Fandi Ahmad, national football player

References

External links

Secondary schools in Singapore
Buildings and structures in Serangoon
Educational institutions established in 1959
Schools in North-East Region, Singapore
1959 establishments in Singapore